KCSN (88.5 FM, "The SoCal Sound") is a non-commercial educational radio station licensed to Northridge, California and owned by California State University, Northridge. The station simulcasts with KSBR from Saddleback College in Mission Viejo. The station primarily airs adult album alternative (AAA) and Americana music with a mix of legends, new music, and local music with some specialty programming on weekends.

KSBR simulcasts this station on 88.5 FM in Orange County.

History
KCSN came to air as KEDC-FM in late 1963. The station signed on with 10 watts, using a transmitter donated by Saul Levine, and broadcast four hours a day of jazz and classical music, in addition to hourly news bulletins produced by San Fernando Valley State College journalism students. Power was increased to 320 watts in 1967 and 3,000 watts in 1970. The 1970 power increase shut out a proposal by the Mexican-American Communication Foundation to build a station on the frequency in East Los Angeles. It became KCSN on February 1, 1973, months after the school became California State University, Northridge; the station was known as "Radio Free Northridge" since 1971.

Beginning in 1987, KCSN aired an all-country format, "Kissin' Country" (a play on how the call letters "KCSN" might be pronounced). The format switch was controversial, earning the station additional donations but alienating it from its student body base. The station also took fire from students who worried that they had less and less of a role in its operation as professional staff were added, in part because KCSN received Corporation for Public Broadcasting grants. In November 1989, two months after classical music station KFAC-FM (92.3) was sold to Evergreen Media and flipped to a "rock with a beat" format, KCSN made a play for those listeners and went all-classical, drawing the ire of the country fans.
As a classical station, KCSN also aired specialty shows on weekends and in late night. As the "Best of Public Radio," KCSN's specialty shows were devoted to German music, Broadway showtunes, children's music, soundtrack music, hip-hop, Hawaiian music, blues, folk, the Beatles, surf music, cocktail tunes, electronic music, and more.

KCSN went to an automated adult album alternative (AAA) format from 6 p.m. to 6 a.m. in 2008, removing most of the specialty shows.

"Smart rock"
On March 1, 2010, KCSN moved all classical music from its primary FM signal to its HD2 channel. The main FM/HD1 channel was switched to an all-AAA programming format without news.

Under the guidance of radio and record company veteran Sky Daniels, some of Los Angeles radio's legendary hosts were hired to host shows on KCSN, including former KCRW host Nic Harcourt; long-time KROQ host Jed the Fish; and Robert Hilburn, the thirty-year Music Editor for the Los Angeles Times.

In the same time period, Tom Petty and the Heartbreakers played two small-hall benefit concerts for the station. Subsequently, Jackson Browne, The Rides, Ryan Adams, Conor Oberst, David Gray, Sarah McLachlan, and Bonnie Raitt performed at the station's annual benefit concerts. Sting also premiered new songs from the station in August 2016.

Harcourt, who stewarded KCRW's Morning Becomes Eclectic to international recognition, hosts the 5-10 am slot, which he sometimes refers to on-air as "Mornings Are Electric." KCSN also is the L.A. radio partner of World Cafe, the program hosted by Talia Schlanger of WXPN/Philadelphia.

KCSN also supports local music in the Los Angeles market. Kevin Bronson, the director of Buzzbands L.A.; has a show devoted to supporting local musicians. The station's new music library typically is represented with local artists by upwards of 30% of the playlist. KCSN has a roster of shows that include AAA, Americana, and blues genres.

KCSN also supports music by hosting live music sessions and interviews with new, local, and legendary artists, the majority recorded by audio engineers Tristan Dolce and Matt Blake.

KCSN's studios are located in the Valley Performing Arts Center on the CSUN campus. The station also opened a satellite studio at The Village At Westfield Topanga in October 2015.

"The New 88.5 FM"
On September 6, 2017, California State University, Northridge and Saddleback College, owner of Mission Viejo-based KSBR, announced the merger of their respective radio stations. The combined operation adopted the branding "The New 88.5 FM". On September 12 at 10 a.m. PDT, the FM and HD1 signals of both stations began simulcasting KCSN’s pre-existing "smart rock" AAA format, while KSBR’s jazz programming would move to their HD2 channels. KCSN’s Latin Alternative relocated to both stations’ HD3 channels.

On March 21, 2018, 88.5 FM announced that former KSWD (100.3 The Sound) radio personality Andy Chanley would host afternoon drive, taking over for Sky Daniels who continued as General Manager and Program Director. Prior to this, Chanley had guest hosted in Daniels’ place for several weeks since January.

On August 18, 2022, it was announced that KCSN will change its branding to "The SoCal Sound" on August 19.

HD programming
In October 2013, the HD2 channel dropped classical and launched a new format known as Latin alternative, which includes Latin pop, modern rock, classic rock, hip-hop, dance music and salsoul. 
.  This format then moved to HD3 as part of the KSBR programming partnership as KSBR's Jazz programming moved to HD2.

KCSN also mentors California State University, Northridge students in broadcasting, music industry, audio engineering and news production. Students produce six-minute morning news segments that air at 6:30am and 7:30am and three-minute segments at 7am and 8am. A nightly half-hour news program called the Evening Update airs at 6pm.

The news department of KCSN has received almost 500 news awards under the leadership of Keith Goldstein, who died in 2016.

These news programs are heard on the HD3 channel.

Translators

Previous logos

See also
 KSBR

References

External links
 

CSN
KCSN
California State University, Northridge
Classical music radio stations in the United States
CSN
Radio stations established in 1964